Yankuba Ceesay (born June 26, 1984), also known as Maal, is a Gambian footballer (midfielder), who plays in Finnish Kakkonen for Kokkolan Palloveikot.

Club career
When Ceesay joined Alianza Atlético of Peru, he became the first Gambian to play professional football in Latin America. He also had a brief trial with Walsall F.C. in January 2008. In 2008, he joined the Swedish club Degerfors IF, and for the first time he represented the Gambia national football team in a match against Senegal.

JK Nõmme Kalju
On 7 March 2012, it was announced that he had signed a two-year contract with Estonian Meistriliiga side JK Nõmme Kalju. He made the league debut for the club on 10 March 2012, in a goalless draw against city rivals FC Levadia Tallinn. He had trials with Charlton Athletic and Leyton Orient in January 2013. On 23 July 2013, he scored Kalju's first ever goal in UEFA Champions League, an opening goal in a 2–1 win against Finnish side HJK. He left the club after the 2013 season, when his two-year contract ended.

References

External links
 
 

1984 births
Living people
Gambian footballers
Wallidan FC players
ŁKS Łódź players
Alianza Atlético footballers
The Gambia international footballers
Gambian expatriate footballers
Expatriate footballers in Peru
Gambian expatriate sportspeople in Peru
Expatriate footballers in Sweden
Gambian expatriate sportspeople in Sweden
Expatriate footballers in Poland
Gambian expatriate sportspeople in Poland
Nõmme Kalju FC players
Meistriliiga players
Expatriate footballers in Finland
Gambian expatriate sportspeople in Finland
People from Serekunda
Association football midfielders
Expatriate footballers in Estonia
Gambian expatriate sportspeople in Estonia
AC Kajaani players